Igal Naor (born ) is an Israeli-Iraqi actor, sometimes credited as Yigal Naor.

Naor was born in Givatayim, Israel, to Mizrahi Jewish parents from Iraq. He has appeared in the American films Munich, Green Zone and Rendition. Naor portrayed Saddam Hussein in the four-episode House of Saddam television docudrama from BBC and HBO (2008), in an acclaimed performance. In Season 5, Episode 4 of Homeland, he portrays General Youssef, a high-ranking Syrian military officer whom the CIA wants to install in place of Syrian President Bashar Al-Assad. He also appeared in the Netflix series, Fauda.

Selected filmography 

 Deadline (1987) - Antoine
 The Seventh Coin (1993) - Grocer
 The Mummy Lives (1993) - Egyptology Official
 Saint Clara (1996) - Headmaster Tissona
 Ha-Dybbuk B'sde Hatapuchim Hakdoshim (1997; also known as Ahava Asura) - Sender
 Miss Entebbe (2003) - Avram
 Bonjour Monsieur Shlomi (2003) - Headmaster Avihu
 Munich (2005) - Mahmoud Hamshari
 Djihad! (2006, TV Movie) -  Colonel Walid 
 Rendition (2007) - Abasi Fawal
 House of Saddam (2008, TV Mini-Series) - Saddam Hussein
 A House Divided (2008) - Ahmed
 Occupation (2009, TV Mini-Series) - Dr. Sadiq Alasadi
 Green Zone (2010) - General Mohammed Al Rawi
 The Infidel (2010) - Arshad El-Masri
 I Am Slave (2010) - Said
 Dead Europe (2012) - Syd
 The Grass Crown (2012)
 Sinbad (2012, TV Series) - Emir
 Farewell Baghdad (2013) - Salman
 Ambassadors (2013, TV Mini-Series) - President Karzak
 The Honourable Woman (2014, TV Mini-Series) - Shlomo Zahary
 300: Rise of an Empire (2014) - King Darius I
 Suicide (2014; also known as Hitabdut) - Muki
 Homeland (2015, TV Series) - General Youssef
 False Flag (2015, TV Series) - Gavriel "Gabi" Silver
 The Women's Balcony (2016) - Zion
 The Promise (2016) - Mesrob
 Riviera (2017, TV Series) - Jakob Negrescu
 Stratton (2017) - Tariq Alawi
 Maktub (2017) - Tzafuf
 Damascus Cover (2017) - General Fuad
 The Unorthodox (2018) - Rabbi Ovadia Yosef
 On the Ropes (2018, TV Mini-Series) - Sami Al-Amir
 Oslo (2021, TV Movie) - Joel Singer
 Legend of Destruction (2021) - John of Giscala
 Wendell & Wild (2022) - Manberg

Awards and nominations 

|-
| 1996
| Saint Clara
| Best Supporting Actor
| Ophir Award
| 
| 
| 
|}

References

External links 
 
 Cast biography on the microsite for HBO's House of Saddam

1958 births
Israeli male film actors
Israeli Sephardi Jews
Israeli people of Iraqi-Jewish descent
Israeli male television actors
Living people
People from Givatayim
Israeli Mizrahi Jews